F. Robert Edwards (born March 26, 1940) is a former member of the Michigan House of Representatives.

Early life and education
Edwards was born on March 26, 1940 in Newberry, Michigan. Edwards graduated from Newberry High School. Edwards earned a B.S. in engineering from the General Motors Institute, now known as Kettering University.

Career
Edwards was a senior project engineer in the Buick division. In 1968, Edwards unsuccessfully ran for the Michigan House of Representatives seat representing the 82nd district. On November 3, 1970, Edwards was elected to the Michigan House of Representatives, where he represented the 82nd district from January 13, 1971 to December 31, 1972. On November 7, 1972, Edwards was elected to the Michigan House of Representatives, where he represented the 82nd district from January 10, 1973 to December 31, 1976. Edwards resided in Flint, Michigan during his time in the legislature. In 1976, Edwards ran for the position again, but was not re-elected. In 1988, Edwards unsuccessfully ran for the state house seat representing the 83rd district. In the mid 1990s, Edwards served as Director of the Michigan Employment Security Commission.

Personal life
Edwards married some time between 1971 and 1974. Edwards is Methodist.

References

Living people
1940 births
Methodists from Michigan
General Motors people
Kettering University alumni
People from Newberry, Michigan
Politicians from Flint, Michigan
Republican Party members of the Michigan House of Representatives
20th-century American politicians